Robert K. Brigham is the Shirley Ecker Boskey Professor of History and International Relations at Vassar College. He is a historian of US foreign policy, particularly of the Vietnam War.

Education 
Brigham earned his undergraduate degree from The College at Brockport, State University of New York and an MA from University of Rhode Island in 1982, prior to receiving his PhD from University of Kentucky in 1994.

Career 
Brigham joined Vassar in 1994. He has received numerous awards, including fellowships from the Rockefeller Foundation, Andrew W. Mellon Foundation, National Endowment for the Humanities, Sid W. Richardson Foundation, and the Social Sciences Committee in Hanoi. In addition, he has been Mellon Senior Visiting Scholar at Clare College, Cambridge, and visiting professor of international relations at the Watson Institute for International and Public Affairs at Brown University.

In 1998, he was an Albert Shaw Endowed Lecturer at Johns Hopkins University alongside Charles E. Neu, Brian Balogh, Robert McNamara, and George C. Herring. From 2007 to 2008, he held the Mary Ball Washington Professorship of American History (Fulbright) at University College Dublin.

In addition to his academic writing, Brigham has published hundreds of reviews and op-ed pieces in newspapers, such as the Washington Post, Wall Street Journal, and the Independent. He has also appeared on NPR, the News Hour with Jim Lehrer, the BBC, CBS Radio, and CNN.  In 2017, Brigham contributed op-ed pieces to The New York Times series, Vietnam '67.

Books 
Reckless: Henry Kissinger and the Tragedy of Vietnam (PublicAffairs, 2018) .

American Foreign Relations: A History, Volumes I & II, Eighth edition (Cengage, 2015) . Co-authored with Thomas G. Paterson, J. Garry Clifford, Michael E. Donoghue, Kenneth J. Hagan, Deborah Kisatsky, Shane J. Maddock.

The Wars for Vietnam: An International History of the Vietnam War (2015). Co-authored with Mark P. Bradley and Lien-Hang Nguyen.

The United States and Iraq Since 1990: a Brief History with Documents (Wiley, 2013) .

The Global Ho Chi Minh (2013).

Iraq, Vietnam, and the Limits of American Power (PublicAffairs, 2008) .

Is Iraq Another Vietnam? (PublicAffairs, 2006).

ARVN: life and death in the South Vietnamese Army (University Press of Kansas, 2006) .

Guerrilla Diplomacy: The NLF's Foreign Relations and the Viet Nam War (Cornell University Press, 1999) .

Argument without End: In Search of Answers to the Vietnam Tragedy (PublicAffairs, 1999) . Co-authored with Robert McNamara, James Blight, Thomas J. Biersteker, and Colonel Herbert Schandler.

References 

American historians
Johns Hopkins University people
Year of birth missing (living people)
Living people